Dieter Mathoi (26 September 1943 – 18 August 2012) was an Austrian architect. With two colleagues, as the firm Heinz & Mathoi & Streli in Innsbruck, he worked for 35 years, building private homes in the alpine landscape of Tyrol, schools, offices and public buildings, among others. He opened his own office in 2008 and was known for prison buildings and for designing the controversial Kaufhaus Tyrol in Innsbruck with David Chipperfield.

Career 
Mathoi studied architecture at the Academy of Fine Arts, Munich, from 1963 to 1967. After several years of practice, he became an assistant at the Institut für Hochbau of Innsbruck University in 1972, where he worked until 1976.

From 1973, Mathoi collaborated with two colleagues, Karl Heinz and Jörg Streli, as the firm Heinz & Mathoi & Streli. While they created many buildings jointly, each architect also pursued his own projects. Mathoi created family homes, including the house of Günther Mader,  markets and a building for the car dealer Vowa in Innsbruck. Together, they built a chapel in 1982, the Sankt-Margarethen-Kapelle in Innerberg, which rises like a tower on a circular floor. They built a home for homeless children as a Gruppenwohnheim (group home) with four separate units, completed in Jagdberg, Vorarlberg, in 1984.

 
The joint extension of the University Hospital in Innsbruck, created by adding a technical and a clinical floor for gynecology and neurology on top, built from 2006 to 2008, was nominated for the award of the Fundació Mies van der Rohe in 2009. The same year, the architects dissolved their firm.

Mathoi opened his own office in 2008. A central project was the Kaufhaus Tyrol department store in the centre of Innsbruck, which Mathoi designed with David Chipperfield. The British star architect had been commissioned by the investor René Benko, after previous plans by Johann Obermoser had been criticised. The design by Chipperfield and Mathoi was initially controversial. The building, opened in 2010, was shortlisted for the prestigious European Union Prize for Contemporary Architecture, the Mies van der Rohe Award, in 2011. It won a RIBA European Award in 2011.

One of Mathoi's special projects were prisons ( in Austria), which he designed to enable humane treatment of the inmates. The Justizzentrum in Korneuburg in Lower Austria, built with the firm DIN A4, was awarded the 2014 , a national prize for architecture and sustainability, as one of five buildings.

Buildings by Mathoi were displayed in the international exhibition Autochtone Architektur in Tirol, including in Munich.

Dieter Mathoi died on 18 August 2012 at age 68.

Buildings 
The joint projects for Heinz & Mathoi & Streli included feasibility studies, city planning, homes for single families and larger units, preschools, schools and buildings for higher education, sports facilities, stores, offices, industrial buildings and traffic buildings. Examples include:

 1978: Hauptschule in Fulpmes (school)
 1978: Fremdenverkehrsfachschule in Zell am Ziller
 1980: Landesberufsschule Feldkirch in Feldkirch, Vorarlberg
 1981: Kapelle Innerberg in Finkenberg (chapel)
 1982: Modegeschäft Einwaller Anna in Innsbruck (fashion store)
 1983: Doppelhaus Knofler/Mikuz, Innsbruck (private homes)
 1984: Landesjugendheim Jagdberg in Schlins (group housing, with Norbert Schweitzer)
 1987: Krankenpflegeschule in Feldkirch, Vorarlberg (school)
 1987: Seilbahn Brixen im Thale in Brixen
 1989: Volksschule in Igls
 1990: Porsche Interauto Verkaufscenter in Innsbruck (car dealer)
 1993:  Barwies in Mieming (grocery store chain)
 1993: Bürohaus EBB in Innsbruck (office building)
 1994: Eisenbahnumfahrung Innsbruck in Mils (traffic)
 1995: Autohaus Vowa in Innsbruck (car dealer)
 1996: Mehrzweckgebäude mit Rasthaus at the Europe Bridge (highway restaurant)
 1996: Wohnanlage und Bürohaus in Innsbruck (housing and office building)
 1998: Totenkapelle an der Pfarrkirche Herz-Jesu in Stans (chapel)
 1999: Hotelfachschule Villa Blanka in Innsbruck
 2001: Landesfeuerwehrschule Tirol in Telfs (firemen's school)
 2004: HTBL und VA Mödling in Mödling
 2005: MPreis Bramberg in Bramberg
 2006: Naturparkhaus Ginzling (parking garage)
 2008: Aufstockung Frauen- und Kopfklinik in Innsbruck (hospital extension)

References

External links 

 Autochthone Architektur in Tirol : individuelle Figuren der Tiroler Baukunst im kollektiven Rahmen der Alpinen Landschaftsrezeption (Ausstellungskatalog) catalog.hathitrust.org

 Heinz - Mathoi - Streli im Archiv für Baukunst der Universität Innsbruck
 Bauherrenpreise zv-architekten.at
 Bürohaus Innsbruck architektur-heinz.at
 vor ort 85 "dieter mathoi: neue justizanstalt west, innsbruck" aut.cc 2007
 vor ort 103 "david chipperfield architects, dieter mathoi architekten: kaufhaus tyrol, innsbruck" aut.cc 2010
 Dieter Mathoi Architekten ZT GmbH, Innsbruck; Arch. DI Axel Birnbaum, Innsbruck architekturwettbewerb.at

1943 births
2012 deaths
Austrian architects
Modernist architects
Academy of Fine Arts, Munich alumni
People from Innsbruck